Glassy cell carcinoma of the cervix, also glassy cell carcinoma, is a rare aggressive malignant tumour of the uterine cervix.  The tumour gets its name from its microscopic appearance; its cytoplasm has a glass-like appearance.

Signs and symptoms
The signs and symptoms are similar to other cervical cancers and may include post-coital bleeding and/or pain during intercourse (dyspareunia). Early lesions may be completely asymptomatic.

Cause

Diagnosis
The diagnosis is based on tissue examination, e.g. biopsy.

Under the microscope, glassy cell carcinoma tumours are composed of cells with a glass-like cytoplasm, typically associated with an inflammatory infiltrate abundant in eosinophils and very mitotically active.  PAS staining highlights the plasma membrane.

Treatment
The treatment is dependent on the stage.  Advanced tumours are treated with surgery (radical hysterectomy and bilateral salpingo-opherectomy), radiation therapy and chemotherapy.

See also
 Cervix
 Cervical cancer
 Villoglandular adenocarcinoma

Additional images

References

Further reading

External links 

Gynaecological cancer
Rare diseases
Infectious causes of cancer